The list of awards and nominations received by Tuna refers to the awards and nominations which were received by Albanian singer Tuna.

Dancing with the Stars 

|-
||2015
||"Tuna"
|Winner
|
|}

Kënga Magjike 

|-
|rowspan="2"|2005
|rowspan="2"|"Testament"
|Critic Prize
|
|-
|Producer Prize
|
|-
||2016
||"Duam"
|Critic Prize
|
|}

NotaFest Awards 

|-
|rowspan="10"|2002
|rowspan="10"|"Ciao Machoman"
|First Prize Of Jury
|
|-
|First Prize of Public
|
|-
|Best Lyrics
|
|-
|Best Performer 
|
|-
|Best Stage Presentation
|
|-
|Arazhmani Prize
|
|-
|Best Orchestration
|
|-
|Best Composition
|
|-
|Best New Artist 
|
|-
|Televoting  Prize
|
|}

Prive Klan Kosova 

|-
||2013
||"Herself"
|Person of The Year 2013
|
|}

Top Fest 

|-
||2006
||"Forca e femres (feat Jonida Maliqi)"
|Best Female
|
|-
||2007
||"Bileta"
|Best Song 
|
|}

Videofest Awards 

|-
||2003
||"Piroman"
|Best Female
|
|-
|rowspan="2"|2005
|rowspan="2"|S'ka me diktature
|Best Female
|
|-
|Best All / First Prize
|
|-
|rowspan="3"|2008
|rowspan="3"|"Bileta" 
|Best Styling
|
|-
|Best Promoted Video
|
|-
|Best Pop
|
|-
||2010
||"E boj nxet (ft.Vig Popa)"
|Best R&B
|
|-
|rowspan="2"|2011
|rowspan="1"|"Pse jo"
|Best R&B
|
|-
||"Vibe(ft. Dafina Zeqiri , 2po2)" 
|Best Performance 
|
|- 
|rowspan="2"|2012
|rowspan="2"|"Dyshemeja"
|Best Female
|
|- 
|Best Pop
|
|- 
|rowspan="4"|2013
|rowspan="4"|"I asaj"
|Best R&B
|
|-
|Best Styling
|
|-
|Best Performance
|
|-
|Best Female
|
|-
|rowspan="3"|2014
|rowspan="3"|"Fenix (ft.Cozman)"
|Best Collaboration
|
|-
|Best R&B
|
|-
|Best Styling
|
|}

Zhurma Show Awards 

|-
|rowspan="1"|2004
|rowspan="1"|"12 Muaj"
|Best R&B
|
|-
|rowspan="2"|2005
|rowspan="1"|"Ska Më Diktaturë"
|Best R&B Album
|
|-
|rowspan="1"|"Psikologët"
|Best R&B 
|
|-
|rowspan="3"|2011
|rowspan="3"|"E para dhe e fundit"
|Best Video / First Prize
|
|-
|Best R&B
|
|-
|Best Female
|
|-
|rowspan="4"|2012
|rowspan="4"|"I asaj"
|Best Video / First Prize
|
|-
|Internet Award
|
|-
|Best R&B
|
|-
|Best Female
|
|-
|rowspan="1"|2013
|rowspan="1"|"Fenix (ft.Cozman)"
|Best Collaboration
|
|-
|rowspan="2"|2014
|rowspan="2"|"MMV (ft.Ghetto Geasy)"
|Best Video / First Prize
|
|-
|Best Collaboration
|
|-
|rowspan="2"|2015
|rowspan="2"|"Nobody there"
|Best Performance
|
|-
|Best R&B
|
|-
|rowspan="2"|2016
|rowspan="2"|"Dy Tima"
|Best R&B
|
|-
|Best Female
|
|}

References 

Sejdiu, Altuna